Semyon Prokopyevich Kadyshev (16 September 1885 – 30 June 1977) was a Khakas Haiji storyteller, Dastan author, and member of the Writers Union of the USSR. He was considered a master of traditional Khakas instruments, such as the Jadagan.

Biography 
Kadyshev was born into a poor family in the Achinsky District, where he learned the art of Haiji storytelling from his father. 

Kadyshev knew and performed over thirty heroic legends, and dozens of legends, traditions and fairy tales. In 1954, Kadyshev was the first of the Khakas folklorists to be admitted to the Writers Union of the USSR. In 1960, he spoke at the 25th Congress of Orientalists in Moscow. He wrote the books Songs of the Khaiji (1962), and The Glorious Way (1965).

For most of his life, Kadyshev lived in the village Chookhchyl. He had wide communication with representatives of the musical community, scientists, and poets. 

In 1965, Kadyshev was awarded the Order of the Badge of Honour for his contribution to the development of Khakas culture.

Kadyshev died in 1977.

Legacy 

 In Abakan, Khakassia, the Khakas Museum of Local Lore was opened in Kadyshev's former house.
 His name is engraved at the Khakas Republican Center for Culture and Folk Art, and on one of the streets of Abakan.
 The International Organization of Turkic Culture declared the year 2015 as the Year of Haldun Taner and Semjon Kadyshev.

References 

Folklorists
Russian writers
Russian folklorists
19th-century writers from the Russian Empire

1885 births
1977 deaths
Khakas